Jamalpur Stadium also known as Beer Muktijoddha Advocate Abdul Hakim Stadium( Bangla: বীর মুক্তিযোদ্ধা এডভোকেট আব্দুল হাকিম স্টেডিয়াম) is located by the Jamalpur Police Lines, beside Jamalpur-Melandaha Road, Jamalpur, Bangladesh. The stadium is used mainly for national day parade, domestic football and cricket leagues and other cultural events.

Hosting national sporting events 

 The zonal host of 3rd National Football Championship from June 18 to 26 in 2003
 The zonal host of 5th National Football Championship from September 15 to 26 in 2005

See also
Stadiums in Bangladesh
List of football stadiums in Bangladesh
List of cricket grounds in Bangladesh

References

Football venues in Bangladesh
Cricket grounds in Bangladesh
Organisations based in Jamalpur District